Armenia and the European Union have maintained positive relations over the years. Both parties are connected through the Comprehensive and Enhanced Partnership Agreement (CEPA), which was signed in 2017. Armenian former Foreign Minister Eduard Nalbandyan expressed confidence that the new partnership agreement would "open a new page" in EU-Armenia relations. While, the former High Representative of the Union for Foreign Affairs and Security Policy, Federica Mogherini concluded in June 2019, that Armenia-EU relations are on an “excellent” level.

Armenia-EU relations

The Partnership and Cooperation Agreement (PCA) (signed in 1996 and in force until February 2021) served as the legal framework for EU-Armenia bilateral relations. Since 2004, Armenia and the other South Caucasus states have been part of the European Neighbourhood Policy (ENP). An ENP Action Plan for Armenia was published on 2 March 2005, "highlighting areas in which bilateral cooperation could feasibly and valuably be strengthened." The plan sets "jointly defined priorities in selected areas for the next five years." In November 2005, formal consultations on the Action Plan was opened in Yerevan.  However, most scholars and commentators have criticized the effectiveness of the ENP in facilitating reform objectives outlined in the Action Plan, especially in relation to democracy, corruption and civil society engagement. Regardless, on 12 January 2002, the European Parliament noted that Armenia and Georgia may enter the EU in the future, as both countries are considered European. Armenia entered the EU's Eastern Partnership in 2009. Armenia is additionally a member state of the Euronest Parliamentary Assembly, Council of Europe, European Political Community, Assembly of European Regions, Organization for Security and Co-operation in Europe, and takes part in various other European programs and treaties such as the European Cultural Convention, European Higher Education Area and the European Court of Human Rights, among others.

Armenia and the EU began negotiating an Association Agreement (AA), which had included a Deep and Comprehensive Free Trade Area agreement, to replace the old PCA in July 2010.  In November 2012, EU Commissioner for Enlargement and European Neighbourhood Policy Štefan Füle stated that the AA negotiations could be finalized by November 2013. The new EU Centre in Armenia, set to become the European Union's communication hub, officially opened in central Yerevan on 31 January 2013. However, on 3 September 2013 Armenia announced their decision to join the Eurasian Economic Union. According to EU politicians, Armenian membership in the Eurasian Economic Union would be incompatible with the agreements negotiated with the EU. President of Armenia Serzh Sargsyan stated at the 2 October 2013 Parliamentary Assembly of the Council of Europe session that Armenia was ready to sign the AA during the November 2013 Eastern Partnership Summit in Vilnius, without the Deep and Comprehensive Free Trade Area component of the agreement that contradicts Armenia's membership in the Eurasian Economic Union. A spokesperson of EU Commissioner Füle responded a few days later by saying "No Armenia-EU document is being readied to be signed at a Vilnius summit" and “We’re trying to find routes for further cooperation with Armenia, based on the existing achievements”. This was followed by other EU officials who echoed this statement.  No AA was ultimately initialed at the summit.  In December 2013, the Polish ambassador to Armenia said that the EU and Armenia were discussing a less in-depth bilateral agreement on their relations, and did "not rule out the possibility that it may be an association agreement in a different form".  In January 2015, the EU commissioner for European neighbourhood policy and enlargement Johannes Hahn stated that the EU was willing to sign a revised AA without free trade provisions. Negotiations were launched in December 2015.

Although Armenia's trade with the EU far exceeds that with Eurasian Economic Union members Russia, Belarus and Kazakhstan combined, Armenia is dependent on Russia for security. Armenia's alliance with Russia, and its membership in the Collective Security Treaty Organization, is seen by Armenia as a counterbalance to Azerbaijan’s sharp hike in military spending (Azerbaijan bought tanks, artillery cannons and rocket launchers worth billions of US dollars from Russia in 2011, 2012 and 2013). This is seen by Armenia as a threat given that the first Nagorno-Karabakh War (an armed conflict that took place from 1991 to May 1994 between Armenia and Azerbaijan) remains unresolved. Russia (also) has a military presence in Armenia, the Russian 102nd Military Base is an active base located in the city of Gyumri.

On 24 February 2017, Tigran Sargsyan, the Chairman of the Eurasian Economic Commission stated that Armenia's stance was to cooperate and work with both the European Union and the Eurasian Economic Union. Sargsyan added that although Armenia is part of the Eurasian Economic Union, a revised European Union Association Agreement between Armenia and the EU would be finalized shortly.

On 27 February 2017, the European Union and Armenia finalized a new agreement on deepening their political and economic ties. Armenian president, Serzh Sargsyan, met with European Council President Donald Tusk and other high-ranking officials in Brussels. The new Comprehensive and Enhanced Partnership Agreement will expand and broaden the scope of relations between the EU and Armenia, but will not be an Association Agreement. It was signed by Armenia and all EU member states on 24 November 2017.

Developments since 2017

2017
On 3 April 2017, the Prime Minister of Armenia, Karen Karapetyan said that Armenia tends to become a bridge between the European Union, Eurasian Union, and other economic blocs. He also said Armenia's membership in the Eurasian Economic Union would not affect its growing relationship with the EU.

A new political alliance in Armenia, comprising several pro-Western parties, had campaigned on opposing further integration into the Eurasian Economic Union and pledged to seek a Free Trade Agreement with the European Union in the 2017 Armenian parliamentary election. Following the 2017 election, the European External Action Service spokesperson Maja Kocijancic said that the EU is committed to a stable, democratic and prosperous future for Armenia and that the EU would strengthen political dialogue and continue supporting economic and social reform in Armenia. Meanwhile, the President of Armenia, Serzh Sargsyan, stated that Armenia seeks to build stronger ties with both Russia and the EU during an election speech.

On 12 April 2017, the Armenian Foreign Minister, Eduard Nalbandyan attended the Eastern Partnership and Visegrád Group meeting in Warsaw, Poland. The Minister stressed the importance of the Eastern Partnership and Armenia's relations with the EU. He touched upon the importance of interconnectivity on the European continent, beginning talks on visa liberalization, welcomed the decision to extend the Trans-European Transport Networks into Eastern Partnership countries, and Armenia's progress of joining the European Common Aviation Area. He also thanked the EU and the European Investment Bank for funding construction of modern highways and border crossing checkpoints with neighboring Georgia. The Minister stated that Armenia is a country willing to bring together the EU, Eastern Partnership states, and Eurasian Economic Union members to foster economic growth and development.

In May 2017, the delegation of the Foreign Affairs Committee of the European Parliament met with the President of Armenia in Yerevan. The President said with satisfaction that in recent years Armenia has registered significant progress in the relations with the European Union. He also stated that Armenia is willing to expand the existing partnership with the EU in all possible areas. Meanwhile, the Speaker of Parliament of Armenia stated that the EU remains one of Armenia's major partners and cooperation with the EU is based on a common value system, during the meeting.

In August 2017, the Way Out Alliance; emerged as a liberal political alliance in Armenia and declared that it was a serious mistake for Armenia to join the Eurasian Economic Union. Party leaders stated that discussions on leaving the Eurasian Economic Union will be on the agenda of the alliance. The alliance maintained a Pro-European orientation and believed that Armenia should have signed an Association Agreement with the EU rather than joining the Eurasian Economic Union.

2018
As a result of the 2018 Armenian revolution, Armenian Prime Minister Serzh Sargsyan announced on 23 April that he would resign to maintain peace in Armenia following daily protests. The EU applauded the peaceful nature of the changes. While opposition leader Nikol Pashinyan advocated for Armenia's neutral position and positive relations with both the EU and Russia. Pashinyan further stated that should he become Prime Minister, he would deepen relations with the EU and would do everything possible for Armenian citizens to be granted visa-free access to the Schengen Area. However, Pashinyan confirmed he would not withdraw Armenia's membership from the Eurasian Economic Union, despite previous discussions questioning Armenia's membership.

Following the 2018 Armenian parliamentary election, Nikol Pashinyan was appointed Prime Minister of Armenia. During his first speech as Prime Minister, Pashinyan declared that Armenians deserved to travel freely within Europe, a perk already enjoyed by other Eastern Partnership members Georgia, Moldova, and Ukraine. EU foreign affairs chief Federica Mogherini congratulated the new leader.

Meanwhile, Bright Armenia emerged as an official opposition party, becoming the 3rd largest party in the National Assembly. Edmon Marukyan, the leader of Bright Armenia stated that should Armenia continue its membership in the Eurasian Economic Union—even to the detriment of national interests, the Bright Armenia party would act as an opponent, and demand that appropriate measures be taken toward withdrawing Armenia from the Eurasian Economic Union and to begin the first steps of EU accession negotiations without delay.

2019
In October 2019, the Deputy Prime Minister of Armenia Tigran Avinyan stated that Armenia and the EU have a completely different level of relationship following the 2018 Armenian revolution. The Minister confirmed that the revolution strengthened ties between Armenia and the EU as both share the same democratic values. The Minister further stated that, "This new political situation is completely in line with the EU’s views". Avinyan also made clear that in the future, Armenia will have to decide whether or not to pursue an EU membership bid. The Minister advised that any decision for Armenia to join the European Union would have to be brought before the people and that future accession of Armenia to the EU would only occur following Armenia's complete withdrawal from the Eurasian Union.

2021
The European Union and Armenia ratified the Armenia-EU Comprehensive and Enhanced Partnership Agreement; which took effect on 1 March 2021. The agreement advances the bilateral relations between the EU and Armenia to a new, partnership level and regulates cooperation in political and economic sectors, while enhancing trade relations. The agreement is also designed to bring Armenian laws and regulations gradually closer to the EU acquis. The Standing Committee on European Integration is responsible for ensuring the terms and agreements of CEPA are implemented.

2022

On 6 October 2022, Prime Minister Nikol Pashinyan participated in the 1st European Political Community Summit held in Prague. During the summit, it was agreed that a European Union led mission would be deployed on the Armenian side of the border with Azerbaijan for a period of two months of monitoring following the Armenia–Azerbaijan border crisis. The mission completed its mandate on 19 December 2022 and was superseded by the EU Planning Assistance Team in Armenia. The EU Planning Assistance Team concluded its activities on 23 January 2023, in preparation for a longer term EU-led mission.

2023

On 27 December 2022, Armenian Foreign Minister, Ararat Mirzoyan wrote to the EU's High Representative of the Union for Foreign Affairs and Security Policy and invited the European Union to deploy a civilian Common Security and Defence Policy mission in the country. The European Union Mission in Armenia (EUMA) was subsequently approved by the Council of the European Union on 23 January 2023 with an initial period of deployment of two years. EUMA's mandate is to contribute to stability in the border areas of Armenia, build confidence on the ground, and ensure an environment conducive to normalization efforts between Armenia and Azerbaijan.

On 27 January 2023, the first high-level Armenia-EU Political and Security Dialogue meeting took place in Yerevan. Deputy Foreign Minister of Armenia Vahe Gevorgyan and Deputy Secretary General of the European External Action Service Enrique Mora discussed increasing political ties and further developing Armenia–EU relations. The parties discussed issues facing Armenia and security challenges across Europe, the deployment of EUMA, the need to establish a stable and peaceful South Caucasus region, and the process of normalization of Armenia–Turkey relations. Enrique Mora stated, "The first ever Armenia-EU Political and Security Dialogue launched today demonstrates our mutual interest in enhancing cooperation on foreign and security policy issues, and readiness to work together for the benefit of peace, security and stability." The Armenia-EU Political and Security Dialogue meetings are expected to convene once annually.

Representation
The Delegation of the European Union to Armenia is the diplomatic mission of the EU in Armenia. It is located in Yerevan. The current EU Ambassador to Armenia is Andrea Wiktorin. Armenia is represented to the EU through its Permanent Mission, located in Brussels, Belgium. The Armenian Ambassador to the EU is Anna Aghadjanian.

Visa liberalization dialogue

Since 2013, European Union citizens enjoy visa-free travel to Armenia.

On 15 March 2017, the former President of Armenia, Serzh Sargsyan announced that Armenia currently takes part in a number of EU agreements and programs and that the EU is an important partner. He also announced that Armenia will launch talks with the EU over establishing visa-free travel for Armenian citizens into the EU's Schengen Area soon. Meanwhile, the former Head of the EU Delegation to Armenia, Ambassador Piotr Świtalski stated that, the action plan for beginning visa liberalization between Armenia and the EU will be on the agenda of the next Eastern Partnership summit in 2017 and dialogue for visa-free travel will begin in early 2018. He stressed the importance of better connecting Armenia with the EU. The Ambassador also stated that Armenian citizens could be granted visa-free travel to the EU by 2020.

On 10 April 2018, the former deputy Foreign Minister of Armenia confirmed that the EU will soon provide Armenia with an action program to launch visa liberalization dialogue. The Minister further stated that Armenia has already been implementing preconditions for launching dialogue over visa liberalization.

On 1 May 2018, the newly appointed Prime Minister of Armenia, Nikol Pashinyan announced that Armenian citizens would be able to travel within the EU's Schengen Area visa-free in the nearest future.

On 24 August 2018, the Chancellor of Germany, Angela Merkel during her meeting with the Prime Minister of Armenia Nikol Pashinyan stated that, “Georgian and Ukrainian citizens do not need visas to enter the European Union, and we will do everything possible to reach visa liberalization with Armenia as well.”

On 18 January 2019, preliminary dialogue on visa liberalization was launched as part of the Armenia-EU Comprehensive and Enhanced Partnership Agreement.

In May 2020, Nikol Pashinyan announced that an agreement has been reached with the EU to start visa liberalization talks. Meanwhile, EU Ambassador to Armenia, Andrea Wiktorin confirmed that the Armenia-EU Comprehensive and Enhanced Partnership Agreement stipulates that the EU will continue to promote the mobility of citizens through a visa facilitation agreement and that she expects official negotiations to begin in due course.

Armenia-EU common aviation area
Armenia is a member of Eurocontrol, the European Civil Aviation Conference and a partner of the European Aviation Safety Agency. After the new Armenia-EU Partnership agreement was signed in February 2017, Armenia began negotiations to join the European Common Aviation Area. During the first round of talks in April 2017, the Head of Armenia's Civil Aviation Department stated that Armenia attaches great importance to joining the common aviation area and that this will allow Armenian and European airlines to further boost their activities and allow more European airlines to fly to Armenia. The EU Delegation in Yerevan stated that the agreement will enable Armenia to have a stronger connection with Europe and the outside world and will open up new travel routes, while reducing travel costs for passengers. Once the agreement is finalized, airlines will have the opportunity to operate new routes without any limitations and enjoy equal opportunities of servicing a market with a population of 500 million.

On 15 November 2021, Armenia and the EU finalized negotiations of the Common Aviation Area Agreement between the two sides at a ceremony held in Brussels. The benefits of the agreement include new air transport opportunities, more direct connections and economic benefits to both sides. All EU airlines will be able to operate direct flights from anywhere in the EU to any airport in Armenia, and vice versa for Armenian airlines. All limitations and restrictions on flights between Armenia and the EU will be removed. With the agreement, Armenia will further align its legislation with EU aviation rules and standards.

Armenia-EU trade
Armenia benefits from the EU's Generalised Scheme of Preferences plus (GSP+) trading initiative. This offers Armenian exports advantageous access to the European single market by allowing complete duty suspension across approximately 66% of all EU tariff lines. More than 96% of EU imports eligible for GSP+ preferences from Armenia entered the EU with zero duties in 2017. The EU is Armenia's biggest export market, trade with the EU accounts for around 26.7% of Armenia's total trade. EU-Armenia trade increased by 15% in 2018 reaching a total value of €1.1 billion.

In 2022, Armenia's bilateral trade with the EU topped $2.3 billion, making the EU one of Armenia's biggest and most important economic partners.

EU assistance to Armenia
The EU is the biggest provider of financial support and a key reform partner in Armenia. As part of the European Neighbourhood Policy, Armenia benefits from EU financial assistance. The amount allocated to Armenia depends on Armenia's commitment to reforms. Certain EU reform targets need to be met before money is paid. The planned amount of EU assistance to Armenia for the period 2017-2020 is up to €185 million.

In July 2021, EU Commissioner for Neighborhood and Enlargement Oliver Varhelyi announced that the EU will be granting an amount of approximately $3.1 billion USD in aid to Armenia, a 62% increase than the amount promised before.

Public opinion
A December 2006 public opinion poll in Armenia found that EU membership would be welcomed, with 64% out of a sample of 2,000 being in favour and only 11.8% being against. Another poll conducted in the Armenian capital Yerevan in October 2006 suggested that "as many as 72% of city residents believe, with varying degrees of conviction, that their country's future lies with the EU rather than the Russian-dominated Commonwealth of Independent States (CIS)."  Still, more than two-thirds of the country's population believed that Armenia would not be ready to join the EU until at least 2019.

A 2007 opinion poll indicated an increase in Armenian EU interest, with 80% of the Armenian public favoring eventual membership.

According to a 2012 opinion poll, 54% (26% strong support+28% rather support) of Armenians supported Armenia's membership in the EU.

The 3 September 2013 decision by Armenia to join the Eurasian Union sparked a series of protests in Yerevan against the action, as many feared that Russia was trying to stop Armenia from building a deeper relationship with the EU just as they had tried to do in Ukraine leading to the Euromaidan demonstrations. Eurasia Partnership Fund director Gevorg Ter-Gabrielyan stated that, "We need to fight against Russian interference" however, he also acknowledged that,“The [Armenian] public largely supports joining with Russia. Plus they don’t like the EU, which they see as a source of perverted values,” he added “They love Russia, at least insofar as the monster you know is better than one you don’t”.

According to a 2017 Gallup opinion poll conducted in Armenia, 27.2% of those surveyed favored integration with the European Union, while 36% favored integration with the Eurasian Economic Union.

According to the 2018 survey by EU NEIGHBOURS east project:

 Pro-EU sentiments are rising in Armenia; 48% of Armenians have a positive image of the EU, the same as in 2017. The number of persons with negative opinions of the EU is just 8%.
 80% of Armenians (up 4% on 2017) feel relations with the European Union are good - well ahead of the regional average (63%).
 70% of people in Armenia trust the EU (up 5% on 2017), while trust in the Eurasian Economic Union (48%) has declined.
 69% of Armenians (up 4% on 2017) are aware of the EU's financial support to the country, and two thirds feel that EU support is effective (66%- up from 62% in 2016 and compared to a regional average of 48% in the Eastern Neighbourhood countries).

According to the 2020 survey by EU NEIGHBOURS east project:

 86% of Armenians (up 10% on 2016) feel relations with the European Union are good - well ahead of the Eastern Partnership regional average (70%).
 60% of people in Armenia trust the EU compared to 51% trusting in the Eurasian Economic Union.
 65% of Armenians are aware of the EU's financial support to the country, and 80% of those who are aware of the support feel that it is effective.

Individual opinions
On 12 January 2002, the European Parliament noted that Armenia and Georgia may enter the EU in the future. There is a lot of interest in Armenia eventually joining the European Union, especially among several prominent Armenian politicians and the general public in Armenia. However, former President Robert Kocharyan, has said he would keep Armenia tied to Russia and the CSTO, remaining partners, and would not seek membership in the EU or NATO. Former President Serzh Sargsyan took a similar position to this issue.

According to Artur Baghdasarian, head of the Rule of Law party and former speaker of the National Assembly, Armenian membership in the European Union "should be one of the key priorities of the country's present and future foreign policy." Baghdasarian believes that "EU membership will open new avenues for Armenia to move to a new geopolitical milieu as well as a new economic environment." He also added that it "will enable Armenia to have access to a completely new security system."

Former Deputy Minister of Trade and Economic Development, Tigran Davtyan, stated "We hope that we will have a clear action plan, by which Armenia will step by step get closer to Europe, to the European value system. Armenia has always been, is and will remain a part of Europe. We have always considered ourselves a part of Europe and the European value system, and Armenia has, even if to a small extent, its contribution to the formation of that value system", during a conference held by OSF Armenia. 

Armenia's former Minister of Foreign Affairs Vardan Oskanyan reiterated in 2005 that "Armenia is Europe. This is a fact, it's not a response to a question." Torben Holtze, former head of the European Commission's representation in Armenia and Georgia and Ambassador of the European Union with residence in Tbilisi, stated "As a matter of principle, Armenia is a European country and like other European states it has the right to be an EU member provided it meets necessary standards and criteria."

Hovhannes Hovhannisyan said there is a quite strong opinion in Armenia that the country's future lies with Europe. "There is no talk about Asia," he said, adding that Armenian society considers itself European and celebrates its European origins and values. He also said Armenia shares a significant history with Europe and that the Armenian language comes from the same language family as many European languages.

On 13 November 2010, former deputy ambassador of Armenia to the United States, Armen Kharazyan stated, "Armenia itself must seek to rediscover and re-establish itself as a part of Europe" and that "Armenia is a fundamentally European society."

On 9 June 2015, Styopa Safaryan, Head of the Armenian Institute of International and Security Affairs, stated that Russia had blackmailed Armenia to not sign an Association Agreement with the EU. Safaryan said that Russia had isolated Armenia and called on Armenian authorities to resume negotiations on signing an agreement with the EU. On 10 August 2015, Safaryan also stated that there are no benefits of Armenia joining the Eurasian Economic Union and that joining the economic union had brought no improvements to the Armenian economy.

Mikael Minasyan, Armenia's Ambassador to the Holy See and Malta stated "Armenia and Europe are, first and foremost, united by our common values. Armenia, Artsakh and Armenian people worldwide have been, and are, inalienable part of European civilization and the Eastern border of the Christian world".

In March 2019, the Vice Speaker of the Parliament of Armenia Alen Simonyan stated, "Over the past 28 years following its independence Armenia, adhered to pan-European values and continues building its cooperation in the European direction," during a ceremony dedicating a section of Northern Avenue as "Europe Square".

In July 2019, the President of Armenia Armen Sarkissian stated that "Armenia is not only a country that signed an agreement with the European Union, but also a country that is and has always been deeply European in terms of culture. Therefore, coming closer to the EU is very natural for us. Armenia is a cradle of European values, from our religion and culture to literature and music," during a meeting with the President of the European Council Donald Tusk in Yerevan. In return, Donald Tusk stated that "Armenia is an integral part of the European family and culture. A place of authentic people who cherish freedom. Sevanavank is a monument that testifies to Armenia's millennia-old imprint on Europe's culture."

In November 2019, during an Eastern Partnership meeting, the former Foreign Minister of Armenia Zohrab Mnatsakanyan stated that "the Eastern Partnership is not a neighbourhood, it’s the eastern flank of Europe. That is the significance of Eastern Partnership. It’s not to the east of Europe, it’s to the east of the European Union, but the European Union is not the whole of Europe. The important challenge is to spread the sense of the Eastern flank of Europe further towards other parts of Europe." The Minister stated that Armenia shares European values of democracy, human rights and accountability to citizens. Mnatsakanyan also advised that a recent survey has shown 92% of the Armenian public considered relations with the EU as very good. The Minister supported the notion that Europe is Armenia's home.

During a press conference, Tigran Khzmalyan, Chairman of the European Party of Armenia stated that, "We are convinced that Armenia is a European state, that we are not only European but also a key culture for Europe." Khzmalyan also stated that the Eurasian Union is a corrupt, hostile and colonial system and that the European Party of Armenia will stand in opposition to Armenia's current membership while supporting the development of Armenia as a European state within the European family of states.

On 21 February 2023, a conference of democratic forces including opposition political parties and civil society took place in Yerevan. Delegates from the European Party of Armenia, Hanrapetutyun Party, Union for National Self-Determination, National Democratic Pole and over a dozen representatives from Armenian civil society organizations participated. Members of the conference called on the Government of Armenia to announce its withdrawal from the CSTO and Eurasian Union and to realign Armenia's military integration with the United States and the West. In addition, the participants signed a declaration calling on the government to immediately submit an EU membership bid for Armenia.

Pro-EU organizations

AEGEE Yerevan is a non-governmental student organization founded in 2010 as a chapter of the European Students' Forum. AEGEE Yerevan supports the development of closer Armenia–European Union relations, the continued European integration of Armenia, and the development of a democratic and diverse society which is politically and socially integrated.

The Armenian Atlantic Association is a non-governmental organization founded in 2001. The organization supports deepening Armenia's relationship with NATO, while encouraging closer ties with the EU.

The Assembly of Armenians of Europe (AAE) is a pan-European organization supporting Armenian communities across Europe and developing closer ties between those communities and European institutions. The organization was founded in 2003 and is based in Belgium.

EUNIC Armenia, founded in 2018, is the Armenian branch of the European Union National Institutes for Culture. The organization seeks to promote cultural diversity and exchange between EU member states and Armenia.

The European Armenian Federation for Justice and Democracy (EAFJD) is a grassroots umbrella organization, based in Belgium, which represents a significant portion of the Armenian diaspora in Europe. The organization was founded in 2002 and actively works on strengthening ties and deepening cooperation between Armenia and the 27 member states of the EU.

The European Business Association Armenia was established in 2015, with support from the EU Delegation in Armenia. The Association seeks to develop economic and trade relations between EU businesses and Armenia, expand bilateral trade,  encourage foreign investments, and support economic reforms in Armenia.

The European Friends of Armenia (EuFoA) is an international non-governmental organization established in 2009, which aims to promote cooperation between the European Union and Armenia. The organization is based in Belgium and coordinates activities between the European Parliament, civil societies, associations and NGO's, as well as the Armenian diaspora and political organizations across Europe.

The European Integration NGO is a non-governmental organization founded in 2000. The organization seeks to strengthen Armenia–EU relations, support the development of civil society, and further integrate Armenia with the Pan-European family of states. The organization also creates and conducts projects and research initiatives that promote democracy, human rights, and European values, as well as raising public awareness and lobbying for Armenia's orientation towards Europe.

The International Center for Human Development, founded in 2000, is a non-governmental think tank. The ICHD supports the European integration of Armenia and seeks to accelerate Armenia’s integration with the European Union.

Pro-EU political parties
There are several political parties in Armenia which advocate for closer relations with the EU or support Armenia's EU membership. These include:
Armenian National Movement Party, the party favors signing an Association Agreement with the EU.
Bright Armenia, the party advocates to increase relations with the EU to a strategic partnership level and to renegotiate a Deep and Comprehensive Free Trade Area agreement with the EU. 
Conservative Party, the party supports closer relations with the EU.
European Party of Armenia, the party is staunchly anti-Russian and calls for the immediate withdrawal of Armenia from the Eurasian Union. The party's manifesto supports Armenia to apply for membership in both the EU and NATO.
For The Republic Party, the party calls for closer ties with the EU.
Free Democrats, the party believes that Armenia should withdraw its membership from the Eurasian Union.
Hanrapetutyun Party, the party supports Armenia's eventual membership in the EU.
Heritage, the party advocates for the integration of Armenia into the EU and ultimate accession.
Orinats Yerkir, the party reaffirms that the eventual membership of Armenia in the EU should be one of the key priorities of Armenia's present and future political agenda.
People's Party of Armenia, the party advocates for deeper European integration.
Union for National Self-Determination, the party believes that eventual EU accession will result in a peaceful settlement of the Nagorno-Karabakh conflict.
Sasna Tsrer Pan-Armenian Party, an anti-Russian party which calls for the withdrawal of Armenia from both the Eurasian Union and the Collective Security Treaty Organisation.
Sovereign Armenia Party, the party supports signing an Association Agreement with the EU.

EU membership perspective

Like Cyprus, Armenia has been regarded by many as culturally associated with Europe because of its connections with European society, through its diaspora, its Indo-European language, and a religious criterion of being Christian. On 12 January 2002, the European Parliament noted that Armenia may enter the EU in the future.

In December 2019, following the eighth Euronest Parliamentary Assembly, a resolution was passed by all members outlining various EU integration goals to be achieved by 2030. The resolution affirms that the process of EU enlargement is open to Eastern Partnership member states and that future enlargement of the EU will be mutually beneficial for both the EU and Eastern Partnership members. The resolution  praised the progress made in Armenia following the 2018 Velvet Revolution. The resolution also stated that, "Armenia is the only country in Europe to transition from being a hybrid regime in 2017 to a democracy in 2018" and that the ratification of the new Comprehensive and Enhanced Partnership Agreement (CEPA) by the Armenian Parliament in April 2018 is considered evidence of a strategically reinforced partnership between Armenia and EU.

See also
Armenia-EU Comprehensive and Enhanced Partnership Agreement
Armenia in the Council of Europe
Armenia–NATO relations
Armenia–OSCE relations
Azerbaijan–European Union relations
Eastern Partnership
Enlargement of the European Union
EU Neighbourhood Info Centre: Country profile of Armenia
Euronest Parliamentary Assembly
European Armenian Federation for Justice and Democracy
European Integration
EU Strategy for the South Caucasus
Foreign relations of Armenia
Foreign relations of the European Union
Georgia–European Union relations
INOGATE
Moldova–European Union relations
Politics of Europe
Russia–European Union relations
Ukraine–European Union relations

References

Further reading
 Fischer, Sabine: "European Policy towards the South Caucasus after the Georgia Crisis" in the Caucasus Analytical Digest No. 1
 Ter-Gabrielyan, Gevorg: "Eastern Partnership Civil Society Forum: The View of a Participant from Armenia" in the Caucasus Analytical Digest No. 35-36

External links
 InsideEurope.org
 AEPLAC: Armenian-European Policy And Legal Advice Centre
 The European Commission's Delegation to Armenia
 Diplomatic Missions of Armenia in Brussels
 Newsletter of Delegation of the European Union to Armenia
 EU Neighbourhood Info Centre

 
Foreign relations of Armenia
Contemplated enlargements of the European Union
Third-country relations of the European Union